The Hyderabad Open is an annual badminton tournament held in India. This tournament is a part of the BWF World Tour tournaments and is leveled in BWF Tour Super 100.

Venue and host city 
 2018–2019: G. M. C. Balayogi SATS Indoor Stadium, Hyderabad, Telangana

Past winners

Performances by nation

See also
India Open
Syed Modi International Badminton Championships
Odisha Open
India International Challenge

Note

References 

 
Badminton tournaments in India
Sports competitions in Hyderabad, India